The 545th Aircraft Control and Warning Group is an inactive United States Air Force unit. It was assigned to the 29th Air Division, stationed at Great Falls Air Force Base, Montana. It was inactivated on 6 February 1952.

This command and control organization activated on 1 March 1951, and was responsible for the organization, manning and equipping of new Aircraft Control and Warning (Radar) units.  It was dissolved with the units being assigned directly to the 29th AD.

Components

 679th Aircraft Control and Warning Squadron
 Great Falls AFB, Montana, 1 March 1951–6 February 1952
 680th Aircraft Control and Warning Squadron
 Palermo AFS, New Jersey, 1 March 1951–6 February 1952
 681st Aircraft Control and Warning Squadron
 Cut Bank AFS, Montana, 1 March 1951–6 February 1952

 778th Aircraft Control and Warning Squadron
 Havre AFS, Montana, 1 March 1951–6 February 1952
 779th Aircraft Control and Warning Squadron
 Opheim AFS, Montana, 1 March 1951–6 February 1952
 780th Aircraft Control and Warning Squadron
 Fortuna AFS, North Dakota, 1 March 1951–6 February 1952

See also
 List of United States Air Force aircraft control and warning squadrons

References

 
 Grant, C.L., The Development of Continental Air Defense to 1 September 1954, (1961), USAF Historical Study No. 126

External links

Aerospace Defense Command units
Air control groups of the United States Air Force
1951 establishments in Montana
1952 disestablishments in Montana